Ezra is a 2017 Indian Malayalam-language supernatural horror thriller film written and directed by Jay K. starring Prithviraj Sukumaran, Priya Anand, Tovino Thomas, Sujith Shankar, Vijayaraghavan Pillai, and Sudev Nair in the leading roles. Principal photography began in late-June 2016. Major filming locations were Fort Cochin and Sri Lanka. The movie grossed 50 crore at the box-office. It was remade in Hindi in 2021 as Dybbuk.
The film was inspired by hollywood horror film The Possession (2012).

Plot
The film opens with the death of the last Malabar Jew in Cochin. An antique seller steals antique items including a strange looking box with Jewish inscriptions from the Jew's house. An unseen force from the box mauls and kills a worker in his shop at night. A.C.P Shafeer Ahammed (Tovino Thomas) is assigned the case but is unable to reach a lead.

Ranjan Mathew (Prithviraj Sukumaran), a nuclear waste management specialist based in Mumbai, is transferred to Kochi with wife Priya Raghuram (Priya Anand). Being both a Marathi and a Malayali, Priya finds it hard to adjust to the shift from Mumbai to Kerala. On a retail therapy, Priya buys the strange box from the antique shop. Upon opening it, paranormal experiences begin.

Ranjan's uncle Father Samuel (Vijayaraghavan), who had looked after Ranjan as an orphan, is invited to Ranjan's house. Samuel feels that something is amiss and he tells Ranjan that the box from the antique shop is a Dybbuk box, with the name “Abraham Ezra” written on it in Hebrew. At his behest, Ranjan finds more about the Dybbuk from a Rabbi David Benyamin (Babu Antony) in Mumbai. He tells Ranjan that the Dybbuk only possesses people with mental instability or children under 3 years, and whoever exorcises the Dybbuk becomes its worst enemy. The next day, Rabbi Benyamin dies and Ranjan learns that Priya is pregnant and realizes his child will be possessed by the dybbuk. Ranjan requests Rabbi Benyamin's son,  Rabbi Marques (Sujith Shankar) for help. Marques arrives in Kochi and finds the Dybbuk is named Abraham Ezra.

Ranjan and Marques find an ex-Jew named Joshua Yehudi, a former friend of Marques' father, and get a historical book from him, which reveals the story of Abraham Ezra in 1941 in Thiru-Kochi. The film moves to the historical era, where a rich Jewish boy Abraham Ezra (Sudev Nair) and a poor Christian girl Rosy (Ann Sheetal)  fall in love during Ezra's visits to Thiru Kochi, and eventually Rosy becomes pregnant. Rosy is not able to tell Ezra that she is pregnant. Ezra's father Yakoob Ezra refuses to let him marry Rosy, since she is not a Jew, and that marrying a woman of a lower social status is unacceptable. Rosy does not reveal to her father nor Yakoob that Ezra is her unborn child's father. Months later, a depressed Ezra writes to Rosy telling her to end the relationship and Rosy commits suicide in heartbreak. Rosy's father finds Ezra's letter and he with the villagers confronts the father-son duo when they arrive in Thiru Kochi. In the ensuing scrimmage, Rosy's father is killed and Ezra is left paralysed. When the doctors said that Ezra will be in this state for the rest of his life, Yakoob decides to take revenge on the town using black magic. He euthanises and puts his son's soul into a Dybbuk box, which on opening will release Ezra's spirit that will possess and destroy. A wooden dummy is buried in place of Ezra's body. Yakoob takes the corpse and dumps it in the sea. Thus is created the Dybbuk box which eventually finds its way to Ranjan.

The story comes back to Ranjan. Marques and Samuel take Shafeer into confidence, both confirm that Abraham Ezra's story is true by exhuming the wooden mannequin.

The film then takes a twist when it is revealed that it is not Priya, but Ranjan who has now been possessed by the spirit when Ranjan would be searching for Priya one night. Fr. Samuel tells them that Ranjan, as an orphan, had mental problems. Hence he was probably vulnerable to the Dybbuk. It is understood that the spirit left Priya and possessed Ranjan when it noted that Ranjan handles nuclear waste and he could be controlled into using that to destroy the city. At last, Ranjan is exorcised and the dybbuk is sent back into the box by Marques, using Jewish exorcism rituals. The box is then taken to the ocean by Marques and Shafeer and dumped, just as Ezra's body was disposed.

Later, Priya gives birth to a healthy baby and she and Ranjan share the news with Marques. In a mid-credit scene, the Dybbuk box is found by two young men along the seashore in Mumbai. They carry it away, planning to open it.

Cast
 Prithviraj Sukumaran as Ranjan Mathew
 Priya Anand as Priya Ranjan Mathew (voiceover given by Angel Shijoy)
 Tovino Thomas as A. C. P. Shafeer Ahammed IPS
 Sudev Nair  as Abraham Ezra
 Sujith Shankar as Rabbi Marques (voiceover given by Sunny Wayne)
 Vijayaraghavan Pillai as Fr. Samuel
 Pratap K. Pothen as Colonel Nambiar
 Babu Antony as Rabbi David Benyamin
Sandeep Narayanan as Ranjan's friend and colleague
 Reina Maria as Lekha
 Bharat Dabholkar as Ezra's father Yakoob Ezra
 Alencier Lopez as Moosa
 Ann Sheetal as Rosy
 Rajesh Sharma as Sabatti
 Thara Kalyan as Priya's mother
 Manikandan R Achari (cameo)
 Balu Vargheese (cameo)
 Indrajith Sukumaran as the narrator

Production 
In February 2016, Jay K, who was an associate director to Rajeev Ravi, announced that he will make his directorial debut through a film called Ezra. It was announced that the film will be a horror thriller involving a love story and will explore the history of Jewish culture in Kerala. Jay K said that the film is not made to frighten the spectators, but has a strong plot. He also confirmed that the film will be dubbed in Tamil and Telugu languages. Mukesh R. Mehta, C. V. Sarathy and A. V. Anoop produce the film under the banner of E4 Entertainment and AVA Productions. Rahul Raj and Tirru were roped in for the music and cinematography respectively. But both of them left the project for reasons unknown. While Tirru left in the early stage of production, Rahul Raj left after giving the song Lailakame.

Box office

The film grossed 1.6 crore in the opening day and 2.5 crore on second day from Kerala box office. It grossed 15.02 crore in its first week from Kerala . The film grossed around 40 crore from Kerala box office. It grossed 50 crore from worldwide box office.

Reception

Critical reception

K R Rajeesh of nowrunning has given a 3.5/5 and praised it for the extensive paranormal research and visuals.
Indian Express rated it at 3/5. Ezra not only tries to frighten the audience but it has got an extraordinary storyline, too.
It also tells the history of the Jews who once lived in Kerala. The remarkable flashback stays as a feeling of sorrow in the audience. It describes how the caste system and discrimination of the society spoils the relationships between people.

Music 

 
Rahul Raj was signed as the composer of the film. He composed the song Lailakame and left the project for reasons unknown. Sushin Shyam, who had worked in Sapthmashree Thaskaraha was then selected to compose the background score in addition to two songs ("Thambiran" & "Irul Neelum").

The song Lailakame became a smash hit, prompting several cover versions, including one by Rahul Raj himself.

An album containing the background score for the film was released separately by Muzik247 in 2017. It contains instrumental pieces by Sushin Shyam backing the narrative horror of the film.

Remake
In April 2019, it was officially confirmed that the Hindi remake of the film Ezra has been commissioned by the production company Panorama Studios and has signed Emraan Hashmi to star in the lead role. Jay K. was signed to direct the remake as well. The film started shooting in Mauritius on 18 July 2019. The film titled as Dybbuk premiered on Amazon Prime Video on 29 October 2021.

References

External links
 Ezra Movie Audience Responses, Critics Review 
 
 

2017 films
Films scored by Sushin Shyam
2017 horror films
2010s Malayalam-language films
2017 horror thriller films
Films scored by Rahul Raj
2010s supernatural thriller films
2010s supernatural horror films
Indian horror thriller films
Malayalam films remade in other languages
Films about exorcism
Dybbuks in film
Indian supernatural horror films
Indian pregnancy films
Indian supernatural thriller films
Films about Jews and Judaism
Films about Christianity
Films shot in Sri Lanka
Films shot in Kochi
Films set in Kerala
Films set in Mumbai
Films about nuclear technology
Cochin Jews
Indian Jews
Judaism in Kerala
Jews and Judaism in India